Bruce Creek is a stream in Stevens County, Washington, in the United States.

Bruce Creek was named for John Bruce, a 19th-century miner.

See also
List of rivers of Washington

References

Rivers of Stevens County, Washington
Rivers of Washington (state)